Philippe Walter Marie Dodard (born 1954) is a Haitian graphic artist and painter. His works have been exhibited throughout Europe and the Americas.

Early life and education
Dodard was born in Port-au-Prince in 1954.

He received the first prize in drawing at the Petit Séminaire Collège Saint-Martial in 1966.

He studied at the PotoMitan Art School with Jean-Claude "Tiga" Garoute, Patrick Vilaire and Frido Casimir. In 1973, he entered the Academy of Fine Arts. After working as layout artist and founding a studio of audiovisual graphic arts, in 1978, he received a scholarship to the International School in Bordeaux, France, enabling him to specialize in pedagogic graphic design.

In 1980 he received a scholarship from the Rotary International Foundation and left on tour with the Group Study Exchange of Haiti to give conferences on Haitian culture.

Career
Dodard worked as an advertising illustrator. 

His artwork has evolved to include large sculptures, fine iron works and fine jewelry design.

Recognition
His paintings have inspired American fashion designer Donna Karan's 2012 Spring collection and a joint exhibition with her at Museum of Contemporary Art, North Miami in Miami, Florida. He has participated in a number of Biennales and exhibitions in the Caribbean, the Americas, Europe, Africa and Asia. Dodard was recently the Guest of Honor at the Festival sur le Niger in Segou, Mali.

In 2018, Dodard participated in the inauguration of the Museum of Black Civilisation of Dakar, and was honored as "Chevalier de l’Ordre national du Lion" by Macky Sall, president of Senegal. His collection "African Memory" is part of the permanent collection of the country's national museum.

Exhibitions (selection)
1981
Aquatisme I,  Galerie Marassa Haiti (solo)

1982  
Aquatisme II, Galerie Marassa Haiti (solo) 

1984
L’Invisible, Colors of Dream and the Marvellous, Galerie Marassa, Haiti (solo) 

1986
Opening of the Shakespeare Festival, Viscaya, Miami Florida (solo) 

1988
Noir et Blanc, Kay Tiga 

1990
Masque, Miroir et Totem, MPPR (Margaret Porter Public Relations), New York (solo) 

1991
Vision III with TIGA and Ronald Mevs, Galerie Armand Paris et Galerie Marassa 

1992
Art Miami 92, Galerie Marassa, Florida (solo).
Soir d’Encrier, with Galerie Marassa, Haitian art Museum of College St-Pierre, Haiti (solo) 
Image Caraïbe, Espaces Carpeaux, Paris, France 
500 Years After, Art Museum of the Americas, Washington D.C. 

1993 
Soir d’Encrier Casa de Francia and Galerie Marassa, Santo Domingo (solo)
The Spirit in Haiti, Galerie Lakaye, Los Angeles, California (solo) 
Presentation of the Book Soir d’Encrier, Galerie Marassa, Haiti (solo) 

1994 
Soir d’Encrier (Ink on Paper), Heim America Fisher Island Gallery, Miami Beach, Florida (solo) 
Découverte Galerie Marassa, Andres Art Gallery, Paris, France 
Art Asia, Hong-Kong
IVe Biennale Internationale de Peinture, Cuenca, Equateur

1995          
Centre Wifredo Lam, La Havane Cuba  
Caribbean Visions, Peinture et Sculpture, Center of Fine Art, Miami Florida Biennale du Dessin de la Caraïbe, Musée d’Art Moderne Santo Domingo 
De Sève et d’Ecorce, chez Gerard with Galerie Marassa (solo)

1996
Galerie Lakaye, Los Angeles, California (solo) 
IIIe Biennale de Peinture de la Caraïbe et de l’Amérique Latine, Musée  d’Art Moderne, Santo Domingo 

1997 
Mirage, (Paintings, Sculptures and Inks) Galerie Marassa, Pétion-Ville, Haiti (solo) 
Casas de Las Americas, La Havane, Cuba  
Caribbean Vision, Anacostia Museum Smithsonian Institution 
Caribe Entranabale, Ultimo Arte, Santo Domingo, Dominican Republic 
Caribbean Visions, Hartford Athenaeum, Connecticut 

1998
Descente aux Enfers, Painting, Sculptures, Inks, with Tiga, Galerie Marassa, Haiti (solo) 
20 years of History: Political Cartoons by Ph. Dodard, celebration of 100 years of the Newspaper Le Nouvelliste, Musee d’Art Haitien, Haiti (solo) 
De l’esclavage d’hier à notre Culture d’aujourd’hui, Arche de la  Défense, Paris, France  
Caribbean Vision, Latin American Art Museum, Los Angeles 
Art Haïtien et Religion, Rettreti Art Centre, Finlande 

1999
48th Venice Biennale, Italy 
Words of Light, Indiana Perdue University, Indianapolis (solo) 
Robert Ferst Center for the Art, Georgia Institute of Technology, Atlanta, Georgia (solo). 
A dance of celebration, with John &  James Biggers, Water work Visual Art Center, NC (solo) 
Voile Metallique, Painting & Sculptures, Galerie Marassa, Pétion-Ville, Haiti (solo) 

2000  
Galerie Soleil, Montreal, Canada (Solo). 

2001
Bonjour d’Haiti, first annual Haitian cultural heritage month, DASH, Miami (Solo). 

2003 
Abbaye de Daoulas : Vaudou, France.
Papier Sensible, Galerie Marassa, Pétion-Ville Haiti (solo) 2002  
Galerie Marassa, Sculptures 

2004
Kafou Marassa, Galerie Marassa, Haiti. 

2005
Galerie Nader, Miami (solo exhibition). 
Origin, wheelhorse gallery, Greenwich, Connecticut (Solo). 
Festival Créole, Galerie Marassa et Action Foundation, Fort-Lauderdale, FL.

2006
The idea of Modernity in Haitian Contemporary Art, Broward Library, Fort Lauderdale, FL 
La Tohue, Galerie Jerome, Montreal, Canada. 
Art off the Main, Expression gallery, Soho, NY.

2007
Ica Fair, The international Caribbean Art fair with Galerie Marassa, The Puck Building, New York.
Me and My Miror, presented by Galerie Marassa Haiti and GMI Art, Coral Gables, Florida 

2008
Metissage one man show with Galerie Marassa Haiti.
Arte Americas 2008, with Galerie Marassa, Miami Beach convention center, Miami Florida  

2009
Irreversible, an international Art Project at Cisneros Fontanals Art Fondation(Cifo), Miami Florida represented by Galerie Marassa, Haiti
Arte Americas 2009, with Galerie Marassa, Miami Beach convention Center.

References

 

1954 births
Haitian painters
Haitian male painters
Haitian people of Mulatto descent
Living people